Vincent Korda (22 June 1897 – 4 January 1979) was a Hungarian-born art director, later settling in Britain. Born in Túrkeve in what was then the Austro-Hungarian Empire, he was the younger brother of Alexander and Zoltan Korda. He was nominated for four Academy Awards, winning once. He died in London, England. He is the father of writer and editor Michael Korda, and the grandfather of Chris Korda.

Academy Awards
Korda won an Academy Award for Best Art Direction and was nominated for three more:

Won
 The Thief of Bagdad (1940)

Nominated
 That Hamilton Woman (1941)
 Jungle Book (1942)
 The Longest Day (1962)

Filmography

 Marius (1931)
 Longing for the Sea (1931)
 Men of Tomorrow (1932)
 Wedding Rehearsal (1932)
 The Girl from Maxim's (1933)
 The Private Life of Henry VIII (1933)
 The Rise of Catherine the Great (1934)
 The Private Life of Don Juan (1934)
 The Scarlet Pimpernel (1934)
 The Ghost Goes West (1935)
 Moscow Nights (1935)
 Things to Come (1936)
 The Man Who Could Work Miracles (1936)
 Rembrandt (1936)
 Men Are Not Gods (1936)
 Paradise for Two (1937)
 Action for Slander (1937)
 The Squeaker (1937)
 The Drum (1938)
 Prison Without Bars (1938)
 The Challenge (1938)
 Over the Moon (1939)
 The Spy in Black (1939)
 The Four Feathers (1939)
 The Lion Has Wings (1939)
 Q Planes (1939)
 The Thief of Bagdad (1940)
 21 Days (1940)
 Major Barbara (1941)
 Old Bill and Son (1941)
 That Hamilton Woman (1941)
 Lydia (1941)
 To Be or Not to Be (1942)
 The Jungle Book (1942)
 Perfect Strangers (1945)
 An Ideal Husband (1947)
 The Fallen Idol (1948)
 Bonnie Prince Charlie (1948)
 The Third Man (1949)
 Outcast of the Islands (1951)
 Home at Seven (1952)
 The Sound Barrier (1952)
 The Holly and the Ivy (1952)
 Malaga (1954)
 Summertime (1955)
 Storm Over the Nile (1955)
 The Deep Blue Sea (1955)
 Holiday in Spain (1960)
 The Longest Day (1962)
 The Yellow Rolls-Royce (1964)

References

External links

1897 births
1979 deaths
Best Art Direction Academy Award winners
British art directors
British people of Hungarian-Jewish descent
Hungarian art directors
Hungarian emigrants to the United Kingdom
Hungarian Jews
People from Túrkeve